Dometiopolis was a city of Cilicia Trachea, and in the later Roman province of Isauria in Asia Minor. Its ruins are found in the village of Katranlı (formerly Dindebul), Ermenek, Karaman Province, Turkey.

History 
The city, whose previous name is unknown, was named Dometiopolis (Greek: Δομετιούπολις) after Lucius Domitius Ahenobarbus (consul 16 BC). According to Constantine Porphyrogenitus it was one of the ten cities of the Isaurian Decapolis.

Episcopal see 
The episcopal see of Dometiopolis is mentioned in Gustav Parthey's Notitiæ episcopatuum, I and III, and in Heinrich Gelzer's Nova Tactica, 1618, as a suffragan of Seleucia. Lequien (Oriens Christianus II, 1023) mentions five bishops, from 451 to 879.

It remains a titular see of the Catholic Church, sometimes under the spelling "Domitiopolis".

References 

Catholic titular sees in Asia
Populated places of the Byzantine Empire
Populated places in ancient Isauria
Populated places in ancient Cilicia
Former populated places in Turkey
Roman towns and cities in Turkey
History of Karaman Province